Golam Mustafa (2 March 1935 – 20 February 2003) was a Bangladeshi actor.

Early life and career
Mustafa first acted in a play named Pallimangal in Barisal in 1945.

Filmography
 Chanda - 1962
 Binimoy - 1970
 Dhire Bohe Meghna - 1973
 Masud Rana - 1974
 Emiler Goenda Bahini - 1980
 Devdas - 1982
 Chhutir Phande - 1990
 Dipu Number Two - 1996
 Ranga Bou - 1998
 Srabon Megher Din'' - 1999

Awards
 Ekushey Padak (2001). 
 National Film Award
 Bangladesh Film Journalist Association Award

References

External links
 

2003 deaths
Bangladeshi male television actors
1935 births
Bangladeshi male film actors
Recipients of the Ekushey Padak in arts
Best Actor National Film Award (Bangladesh) winners
People from Khulna
Best Supporting Actor National Film Award (Bangladesh) winners